Ang Padrino is a 1984 Philippine action film co-written, produced and directed by Fernando Poe Jr. The film also stars Poe as the titular Padrino, a local adaptation of the film, The Godfather. The film is notable for the casting of radio personality, Rey Langit (of Kasangga Mo ang Langit fame) as an antagonist in the film.

Cast and characters 

Fernando Poe Jr. as Emong Sanchez
Coney Reyes as Chayong Sanchez
Fred Montilla as Atty. Dela Costa
Rey Langit as Hitman
Johnny Delgado as Jimmy
Lito Anzures as Sgt. Quintiliano
Ruel Vernal as Pepeng Tambak
Lucita Soriano Lita Quintiliano
Zandro Zamora as Tony Sanchez
Rez Cortez as Jake
Ricky Davao as Alex dela Costa
Allan Bautista as Frankie
Alex Leviste as Totoy
Amay Bisaya as Donggay
Gigi dela Riva as Selina
Max Alvarado as Tasyo
Daria Ramirez as Alice
Larry Silva as Hilarion
Cesar Montano as Noring
Rosemary Sarita as Lilia
Mario Taguiwalo as Pidyong
Tina Loy
Joaquin Fajardo
King Gutierrez
Rene Hawkins
Nonoy de Guzman
Boy Bañez
Belo Borja
Nenette Cellona
Ernie David
Bebot Davao
Bert Garon
Eddie Gicoso
Pons de Guzman
Romy Guarin
Eddie del Mar
Michael Murray
Robert Rivera
Er Canton Salazar
Angie Salinas
Naty Santiago
Eddie Samonte
Eddie Tuazon
Angelo Ventura

Accolades

References

External links

1984 films
1984 action films
Filipino-language films
Films set in Manila
FPJ Productions films
Philippine action films
Films directed by Fernando Poe Jr.